C. braunii is a species abbreviation which may refer to:

Chara braunii
Characium braunii
Cyphostemma braunii
Cyathula braunii
Cereus braunii